Linssen is a Dutch patronymic surname specific to Dutch Limburg. It and Linsen appear to be a hypercorrection of the name Lenssen/Lensen, where "Lens" is a local short form of the given name Laurence. Notable people with the surname include:

Bryan Linssen (born 1990), Dutch football forward
Edwin Linssen (born 1980), Dutch football midfielder
Fernand Linssen (1928–2011), Belgian sprinter
Henri Linssen (1805–1869), Dutch painter
Jan Linsen (1602/03–1635), Dutch painter of mythological and historical themes
Jan Linssen (1913–1995), Dutch football forward
Jean Linssen (1904–1961), Belgian long-distance runner
Johannes Linßen (born 1949), German football player and coach
Marie-Louise Linssen-Vaessen (1928–1993), Dutch freestyle swimmer
Robert Linssen (1911–2004), Belgian Zen Buddhist and author
Saskia Linssen (born 1970), Dutch model and actress
Lenssen
Fabian Lenssen (born 1960s), Dutch music producer, songwriter and remixer
Ted Lenssen (born 1952), Dutch-Canadian ice hockey goaltender

See also
Mathilda Linsén (1831–1872), Finnish pedagogue
Linsen mit Spätzle ("lentils with pasta"), a Swabian dish

References

Dutch-language surnames
Limburgian surnames
Patronymic surnames